Santa Fe Springs (Santa Fe, Spanish for "Holy Faith") is a city in Los Angeles County, California, United States. It is one of the Gateway Cities of southeast Los Angeles County. The population was 16,223 at the 2010 census, down from 17,438 at the 2000 census.

Etymology
Santa Fe  Springs, which is Spanish meaning “holy faith,” was first applied to mineral springs purchased by the Atchison, Topeka and Santa Fe Railway from Dr. James E. Fulton in 1886.

Geography

It is bordered by the unincorporated West Whittier-Los Nietos to the north, Pico Rivera to the northwest, Downey to the west, Norwalk to the southwest, Cerritos to the south, La Mirada and the unincorporated South Whittier to the east, and Whittier to the northeast.

History
Junípero Serra had started some missions in this area, especially the San Gabriel mission. By 1806, the natives, now called Gabrieleños than Sejats, were forced into labor to build the mission.

Corporal José Manuel Nieto, then 65 year old, petitioned Pedro Fages, the Governor, for a little land. In 1789, Fagas received official permission for the grant. This became known as the "Rancho La Zanja", to which he moved with his wife Teresa and his son, Juan José. This area soon became a large cattle empire, and later would be the Santa Fe Springs area.

Dr. James E. Fulton came to the area as an agent for the San Gertrudes Land Company in 1871. He found, when drilling a well, a sulfur spring, and developed it by 1874 into a health spa with a 2-story sanitarium-hotel called Fulton's Sulfur Wells in the area around what today would be Heritage Park. It included a windmill to draw water into the pool for bathers. In the beginning he had about 400 patients there annually. Later, in 1886, the Atchison, Topeka & Santa Fe Railway purchased land from Fulton to run the train line from Los Angeles to San Diego, changing the town since now there was rail transportation.

In 1907, the Union Oil Company of California began drilling near the intersection of Norwalk Blvd. and Telegraph Road, locally known as "Four Corners," with the spudding in of the Meyer No. 1 well. That well, and a subsequent one, failed. In 1921 the Union-Bell well blew in as a 2,500-barrel gusher and set off an oil rush by major oil companies and fly-by-night producers. Within a year the Santa Fe Springs oil field was considered one of the richest pools in petroleum history. Santa Fe Springs became a promoters' paradise. Prospective investors were bused into the field, served a free lunch in circus tents, and told stories about the fortunes made in oil. In 1923 the state legislature limited the amount of stock that could be sold in a well.

In the 1920s the field produced as much as 345,000 barrels daily, exceeding production at Signal Hill and Huntington Beach. Production slowed as the decade went on, and by 1928 the Wilshire Oil Company was drilling in deep sand levels.  Production levels dropped each year from then on, but by 1938 the field had yielded a total of more than 440,000,000 barrels of oil.

Santa Fe Springs is the birthplace of the Shelby Cobra. In 1962 Carroll Shelby set up shop in Dean Moon's speed shop in Santa Fe Springs. Shelby had AC Cars of Surrey, England ship cars without a motor or drive train to the Santa Fe shop. Shelby shoe-horned a 260-cubic-inch V8 into the tiny, lightweight British roadster and the Cobra was born: a British sports car with American hot rod power.

Demographics

2015
According to DataUSA, the racial makeup of Santa Fe Springs was 79% Hispanic (13,534), 10% white (1,752), 6% Asian (1,080), and 2.4% Black (424).

2010
At the 2010 census Santa Fe Springs had a population of 16,223. The racial makeup of Santa Fe Springs was (11.6%) White, (2.3%) African American, 233 (1.4%) Native American, 677 (4.2%) Asian, (4.2%) from two or more races. Hispanic or Latino of any race were 13,137 persons (81.0%).

The census reported that 16,030 people (98.8% of the population) lived in households, 85 (0.5%) lived in non-institutionalized group quarters, and 108 (0.7%) were institutionalized.

There were 4,747 households, 2,093 (44.1%) had children under the age of 18 living in them, 2,354 (49.6%) were opposite-sex married couples living together, 965 (20.3%) had a female householder with no husband present, 368 (7.8%) had a male householder with no wife present.  There were 286 (6.0%) unmarried opposite-sex partnerships, and 26 (0.5%) same-sex married couples or partnerships. 894 households (18.8%) were one person and 526 (11.1%) had someone living alone who was 65 or older. The average household size was 3.38.  There were 3,687 families (77.7% of households); the average family size was 3.84.

The age distribution was 4,286 people (26.4%) under the age of 18, 1,770 people (10.9%) aged 18 to 24, 4,272 people (26.3%) aged 25 to 44, 3,735 people (23.0%) aged 45 to 64, and 2,160 people (13.3%) who were 65 or older.  The median age was 35.3 years. For every 100 females, there were 93.0 males.  For every 100 females age 18 and over, there were 90.0 males.

There were 4,976 housing units at an average density of 558.2 per square mile, of the occupied units 2,894 (61.0%) were owner-occupied and 1,853 (39.0%) were rented. The homeowner vacancy rate was 2.1%; the rental vacancy rate was 5.5%.  10,323 people (63.6% of the population) lived in owner-occupied housing units and 5,707 people (35.2%) lived in rental housing units.

According to the 2010 United States Census, Santa Fe Springs had a median household income of $54,081, with 9.1% of the population living below the federal poverty line.

2000
At the 2000 census there were 17,438 people in 4,834 households, including 3,780 families, in the city. The population density was 1,992.0 inhabitants per square mile (769.5/km). The racial makeup of the city was 51.22% White, 3.89% African American, 1.43% Native American, 3.95% Asian, 0.20% Pacific Islander, 34.99% from other races, and 4.31% from two or more races. Hispanic or Latino of any race were 71.38%.

As of 2000, speakers of Spanish as their first language accounted for 51.63% of residents, while English was spoken by 46.07%, Tagalog was spoken by 1.05%, Vietnamese was spoken by 0.68%, Korean was spoken by 0.37%, French by 0.17% of the population.

Of the 4,834 households 38.3% had children under the age of 18 living with them, 54.0% were married couples living together, 18.1% had a female householder with no husband present, and 21.8% were non-families. 18.3% of households were one person and 11.2% were one person aged 65 or older.  The average household size was 3.35 and the average family size was 3.82.

The age distribution was 29.1% under the age of 18, 9.4% from 18 to 24, 29.7% from 25 to 44, 19.1% from 45 to 64, and 12.8% 65 or older.  The median age was 33 years. For every 100 females, there were 100.1 males.  For every 100 females age 18 and over, there were 97.4 males.

The median household income was $44,540 and the median family income  was $49,867. Males had a median income of $33,413 versus $27,279 for females. The per capita income for the city was $14,547.  About 8.0% of families and 12.5% of the population were below the poverty line, including 13.9% of those under age 18 and 7.6% of those age 65 or over.

Government

Emergency services

Law Enforcement
Police services for the city are contracted by the Whittier Police Department, based at the Santa Fe Springs Police Services Center sub-station.  The police services center is located on Telegraph Road.

Fire
The Santa Fe Springs Department of Fire - Rescue provides fire protection and rescue services for the city of Santa Fe Springs.

Economy

The economy of Santa Fe Springs is largely made up of light industry, unlike its neighboring cities.  This is evident when looking at satellite and aerial photography, where the majority of the city is distinguishable from its neighboring cities, due to the density of very large, industrial and manufacturing facilities.

Santa Fe Springs is home to Egge Machine Company, supplier of Cadillac engine parts for custom cars and hot rods and also is home to U.S. Aerospace, a publicly traded aerospace and defense contractor for the United States Department of Defense and the United States Air Force, Lockheed Martin Corporation, The Boeing Company, L-3 Communications Holdings, the Middle River Aircraft Systems subsidiary of General Electric Company, and other aircraft manufacturers, aerospace companies, and defense contractors. Other companies based in Santa Fe Springs include Fuji Food.

The Hathaway Ranch Museum in Santa Fe Springs houses an extensive collection of early ranching and farming equipment, as well as oil field machinery.  The museum traces five generations of the Hathaway family and is a reflection of the economic transition of the region.

Retail

Santa Fe Springs was, in the past, home to two regional malls and one open-air shopping center anchored by department stores. These have been converted to open-air shopping centers anchored by supermarkets and discount stores.

Top employers
According to the city's 2020 Comprehensive Annual Financial Report, the top employers in the city are:

Transportation
Santa Fe Springs is served by Metrolink from its Norwalk/Santa Fe Springs station. Metro Local and Norwalk Transit provide local bus service.

Interstate 5 and Interstate 605 have exits in Santa Fe Springs.

Sections

Carmenita

Sister cities
 Navojoa, Sonora, Mexico
 Santa Fe, Argentina
 Tirschenreuth, Bavaria, Germany

References

External links

 
Cities in Los Angeles County, California
Gateway Cities
Incorporated cities and towns in California
1957 establishments in California
Populated places established in 1957